Thomas Guldborg Christensen (born 20 January 1984) is a Danish former professional footballer who played as a defender.

Career
Until the age of 20, Guldborg Christensen played for the local team Akademisk Boldklub, where he in 2001 made his senior debut in the Danish Superliga. During this tenure he won several caps for the Danish younger national teams. Three years later, in 2004, he signed a contract with Viborg FF.

On 1 July 2006, Guldborg Christensen joined Vejle on a two-year contract. But only a half year later, in January 2007, he went on loan to Herfølge, where he later signed permanently. The club rebranded itself as HB Køge in 2009 where he continuously played as a regular. He was appointed as the new team captain in 2010.

In 2012, Guldborg Christensen moved abroad for the first time in his career, signing for Hammarby IF in the Swedish Superettan. He linked up with his former teammate Mikael Rynell at the Stockholm-based outfit. He soon established himself as a regular starter at the centre back position, whilst being a part of a successful promotion campaign to Allsvenskan in 2014. Guldborg Christensen signed a new one year-contract with the club in November said year.

Guldborg Christensen left the club by mutual consent in May 2015, failing to make a single appearance for "Bajen" in Allsvenskan. He immediately signed a short time-deal with the Icelandic club Valur, competing in the Úrvalsdeild.

Guldborg Christensen returned to his native country in August 2015, signing a two year-contract with Lyngby BK in the Danish second tier.

On 7 December 2017, he announced his retirement to instead work for the Danish Football Association as a coordinator for the youth national teams.

References

External links
Career statistics at Danmarks Radio

1984 births
Living people
People from Gladsaxe Municipality
Sportspeople from the Capital Region of Denmark
Danish men's footballers
Association football defenders
Denmark youth international footballers
Danish Superliga players
Danish 1st Division players
Allsvenskan players
Superettan players
Viborg FF players
Vejle Boldklub players
Herfølge Boldklub players
HB Køge players
Hammarby Fotboll players
Valur (men's football) players
Lyngby Boldklub players
Danish expatriate men's footballers
Danish expatriate sportspeople in Sweden
Expatriate footballers in Sweden